Adios del Sol (Farewell to the Sun) or Adios al Sol (Farewell from the Sun) is an 1893 historical painting by award-winning Filipino painter and hero Félix Resurrección Hidalgo.  The painting won Hidalgo a silver medal during the 1893 Chicago Universal Exposition in the United States.  

Although created in the "grand manner" style of painting, Adios del Sol is a "seascape with figure" that marked Hidalgo's departure from the traditional way of painting.  The masterpiece is also one of the paintings that marked Hidalgo as a reputable painter in Philippine history of art and in the so-called "popular mind" (the other painting is Jovenes Cristianas Expuestas al Populacho).

References

1893 paintings
Paintings by Félix Resurrección Hidalgo